Maximator may refer to:

Beer 
 Amsterdam Maximator
 Augustiner Maximator

Organisations 
 Maximator (intelligence alliance), an intelligence alliance between Denmark, Germany, France, the Netherlands, and Sweden.

People 
 Max Schuar, nicknamed Maximator, a member of the band Eisbrecher